Lotaryov is the name of:

 Igor Severyanin (real name Igor Vasilyevich Lotaryov; 1887-1941), Russian poet 
 Igor Lotaryov (born 1964), Russian middle distance runner
 Vladimir Lotaryov (1914-1994), Soviet designer of jet engines (see Ivchenko-Progress)

Russian-language surnames